Purgly is a surname. Notable people with the surname include:

Emil Purgly (1880–1964), Hungarian politician
Magdolna Purgly (1881–1959), Hungarian noble

Hungarian-language surnames